Dimitrios Serpezis (born 14 March 2001) is a Greek professional footballer who plays as a midfielder for Super League 2 club Panathinaikos B.

Career
Serpezis joined Panathinaikos from the team's youth ranks.

Career statistics

References

Living people
2001 births
Greek footballers
Footballers from Athens
Association football midfielders
Greece youth international footballers
Super League Greece players
Super League Greece 2 players
Panathinaikos F.C. players
Panathinaikos F.C. B players